Florian Wustinger (born 21 July 2003) is an Austrian professional footballer who plays as a midfielder for Austria Wien.

Career
Wustinger is a youth product of 1. SC Pfaffstätten and Rapid Wien, joining the latter's youth academy in 2010. Beginning his career with Austria Wien's reserves, He was promoted to their senior team in January 2022. He signed his first professional contract with the club on 22 March 2022. He made his senior debut with Austria Wien in a 2–0 Austrian Football Bundesliga win over SC Rheindorf Altach on 22 February 2022.

International career
Wustinger represented the Austria U19s at the 2022 UEFA European Under-19 Championship.

Personal life 
Wustinger's father Jochen (* 1972) was a Bundesliga professional at Admira/Wacker , his grandfather Anton also played first-class at the WSC.

References

External links
 
 OEFB Profile

2003 births
Living people
Footballers from Vienna
Austrian footballers
Austria youth international footballers
FK Austria Wien players
Austrian Football Bundesliga players
2. Liga (Austria) players
Association football midfielders